All White(s) may refer to:

 All Whites, the New Zealand national football (Soccer) team
 "All White", a song by …And You Will Know Us by the Trail of Dead from Worlds Apart

See also 
 All-white jury
 Al White (disambiguation)
 Color line (civil rights issue)
 White (disambiguation)